Khareng (also Romanized as Khāreng and Khārang; also known as Khārnak) is a village in Jolgeh Rural District, in the Central District of Behabad County, Yazd Province, Iran. At the 2006 census, its population was 14, in 5 families.

References 

Populated places in Behabad County